Volkswagen Golf R32 may refer to two different Volkswagen Golf models:

 Volkswagen Golf Mk4 R32, a 2003 model
 Volkswagen Golf Mk5 R32, a 2005 model